Anthony Joseph Naylor (born 29 March 1967) is an English former footballer. He is best known for his spells at Port Vale and Crewe Alexandra in the 1990s.

He moved to Dario Gradi's Crewe from non-league Droylsden in 1990, turning professional at the age of 23. After two successive promotion-hunting campaigns ended at the play-off stage, he helped the Alex to automatic promotion in 1993–94. His goals impressed John Rudge at nearby Port Vale, and a £150,000 deal was struck between the two rival clubs in 1994. He went on to spend the next seven years at Vale Park, playing in the Anglo-Italian Cup final in 1996, as well as the club's Football League Trophy success in 2001. Three times Vale's top-scorer, he left on a free transfer to Cheltenham Town in 2001. He helped Cheltenham to win promotion via the play-offs in 2002, before he entered the non-league scene with Telford United in 2003. He retired as a player in 2005, though would make brief a brief cameo at Ashton United in 2006.

Career
Naylor began his career at non-league Droylsden. Having caught the eye of Crewe Alexandra boss Dario Gradi, the striker completed an £11,000 switch to the "Railwaymen" in March 1990. His new club went on to be relegated at the end of the season, however Naylor helped Crewe to the Fourth Division play-offs in 1991. Hopes of an immediate return to the third tier were then dashed after defeat to Scunthorpe United at the semi-final stage. He helped them into the play-off final the following year, at which point they lost out to York City in a penalty shoot-out at Wembley. On the way to the final he set a club record for most goals in a match when he scored five in a game against Colchester United on 24 April 1993. Promotion finally came in 1993–94, as Naylor's goals helped to assure Alex of the third automatic promotion place.

After four years in South Cheshire, Naylor was snapped up by local rivals Port Vale in a £150,000 deal. John Rudge's "Valiants" splashed the cash after sealing promotion from the Second Division on the last day of the 1993–94 season, and Naylor would join the side for the new season in the First Division. He played in the 1996 Anglo-Italian Cup Final, as Vale lost 5–2 to Genoa. He was with the "Valiants" through one of the club's most successful periods as they finished eighth in the 1996–97 First Division (the club's highest finish since the 1930s), with Naylor claiming 20 goals in 49 appearances, including a hat-trick past Charlton Athletic whilst playing as a lone striker in a 3–1 win at The Valley on 14 December. The club also managed to win the Football League Trophy in 2001, as they defeated Brentford 2–1 in the final at the Millennium Stadium in Cardiff. In total he managed to notch 90 goals in his seven years at Vale Park, finishing as the club's top goalscorer at the end of the 1995–96, 1996–97 and 2000–01 seasons with 12, 20 and 21 goals respectively. He scored a brace in a 3–1 win over Sunderland on 23 August 1997, showing his "sublime skill" as his "twinkling feet made them statuesque". His last goal for the club was also the last goal at Oxford United's Manor Ground in May 2001.

The striker turned down the offer of a new contract for pastures new, and Cheltenham Town ended up being his next port of call, as he joined the Gloucestershire club on a two-year contract. Naylor's goals guided the Robins to promotion to League One, via the play-offs, in his first season. It was the first time Cheltenham had been that high in the Football League pyramid. Manager Steve Cotterill was keen to praise Naylor, as was his successor Graham Allner. However, he was unable to prevent relegation the following season and was released at the end of the 2002–03 campaign, after scoring 26 goals in 86 games for the club.

Following a brief stay at Stone Dominoes, the pint-sized forward joined Conference National outfit Telford United shortly into the 2003–04 campaign, linking up with one of his strike partners from his Port Vale days in Lee Mills. Naylor quickly endeared himself to the supporters at the New Bucks Head with his trademark pacey and tenacious displays particularly when he scored the second goal in a 2–1 victory of local rivals Shrewsbury Town in the FA Trophy. Naylor eventually went on to make 29 appearances during the season scoring 11 goals. Despite helping Telford to reach the fourth round of the FA Cup and the semi-finals of the FA Trophy, United were beset by off the field problems during the final few months of the 2003–04 season, and folded at the end of the campaign after their finances spiralled out of control. Naylor was again on the lookout for a new club and was linked with a move to Shrewsbury Town after his impressive displays against them for Telford, but this never materialised, and after several fruitless trials he eventually retired from the professional game.

He joined former club Port Vale in March 2005, now managed by his former strike partner Martin Foyle, but did not make an appearance. During the 2005–06 season Naylor joined Ashton United as assistant to manager Scott Green, a former teammate of his from their Telford days. When the club were hit by an injury crisis he donned his boots once more and scored twice from the penalty spot in a 2–2 draw at Frickley Athletic.

Style of play
Naylor was a forward who used his pace to make runs in behind defenders and also to chase the ball down and try and tackle defenders. In May 2019, he was voted into the "Ultimate Port Vale XI" by members of the OneValeFan supporter website.

Career statistics
Source:

Honours
Crewe Alexandra
Football League Third Division third-place promotion: 1993–94

Port Vale
Anglo-Italian Cup runners-up: 1996
Football League Trophy: 2001

Cheltenham Town
Football League Third Division play-offs: 2002

References

1967 births
Living people
Footballers from Manchester
English footballers
Association football forwards
Droylsden F.C. players
Crewe Alexandra F.C. players
Port Vale F.C. players
Cheltenham Town F.C. players
Stone Dominoes F.C. players
Telford United F.C. players
Ashton United F.C. players
English Football League players
National League (English football) players
Association football coaches